Johannes Kastaja is the first EP by CMX. It, with Raivo, is included on Kolmikärki Gold, the 2002 re-release of the band's debut album. "Lapsi" became something of a cult song, with controversial lyrics about child sexual abuse.

The cover art is made by Läjä Äijälä.

Personnel 
A. W. Yrjänä -- vocals, bass
Kimmo Suomalainen -- guitar
Pekka Kanniainen -- drums

Track listing 
All songs written by A. W. Yrjänä, except where noted.
"Mielipuolinen rakkaus" (Kanniainen, Suomalainen, Yrjänä) -- 1:30
"Lapsi"—1:46
"Siunattu otsa" (Kanniainen, Suomalainen, Yrjänä) -- 1:58
"My Tribe"—0:54
"On the Wing"—0:59
"Shaman's Prayer"—2:58

References 

CMX (band) albums
1987 EPs